The 1917 St. Xavier Musketeers football team was an American football team that represented St. Xavier College (later renamed Xavier University) as an independent during the 1917 college football season. The team compiled a 4–1–2 record but was outscored by a total of 40 to 39. The team had no head coach.

Schedule

References

St. Xavier
Xavier Musketeers football seasons
St. Xavier Saints football